Stylianos Petrakis is a Greek naval officer. He serves as Chief of the Hellenic Navy General Staff .

References 

Year of birth missing (living people)
Living people
People from Lappa, Rethymno
Hellenic Navy admirals
Chiefs of the Hellenic Navy General Staff
21st-century Greek people